Armenian Diocese of Cyprus ( Kiprosi Hayots Tem), is one of the oldest dioceses of the Armenian Apostolic Church outside the historic Armenian territories, covering the Republic of Cyprus. It has been founded during the 12th century and currently has around 3,500 followers, comprising around 95% of the Armenians in Cyprus. The diocese is under the jurisdiction of the Holy See of Cilicia of the Armenian Church.

The seat of the diocese is the Holy Mother of God Cathedral of Nicosia. The prelacy building is situated near the cathedral, on 47 Armenia Avenue, Strovolos, Nicosia. Archbishop Khoren Doghramadjian is currently the primate vicar of the diocese, serving since March 2017.

History

The Armenian Diocese of Cyprus was established in 973 by Catholicos Khatchig I and ever since it has maintained a continuous presence on the island. In the years that followed, some of its Prelates participated in important church synods, such as Tateos (who participated in the Council of Hromkla in 1179), Nigoghaos (who participated in the Synod of Sis in 1307) and Krikor (who participated in a conference of Greek Orthodox Bishops in Cyprus in 1340). The antiquity of the Armenian Church in Cyprus was confirmed by a bull of Pope Leo X, which was issued in 1519 after multiple discords, according to which the Armenian Prelate would be senior to and take precedence over the Maronite, Jacobite and Coptic Prelates.

Historically, the Prelature has been under the jurisdiction of the Catholicosate of the Great House of Cilicia, while today it is the oldest theme that falls under its jurisdiction. In the past, for various reasons, it was at times under the Armenian Patriarchate of Jerusalem (1775–1799, 1812–1837, 1848–1861, 1865–1877, 1888–1897, 1898–1908), the Armenian Patriarchate of Constantinople (1799–1812, 1861–1864, 1877–1888, 1897–1898, 1908–1921), even the Catholicosate of Etchmiadzin (1864–1865). Cyprus was the place of refuge for two exile Patriarchs of Constantinople, Archbishop Tavit Areveltsi (1644-1648) and Senior Archimandrite Krikor Basmadjian (1773-1775). The current Prelate, a Catholicosal Vicar General, is as of March 2017 Archbishop Khoren Doghramadjian. The parish priest in Nicosia is Fr. Momik Habeshian (since 2000), while the parish priest in Larnaca and Limassol is Fr. Mashdots Ashkarian (since 1992).

For centuries, the Prelature building was located within the Armenian compound in Victoria street in walled Nicosia; when that area was taken over by Turkish-Cypriot extremists in 1963–1964, the Prelature was temporarily housed in Aram Ouzounian street (1964–1968) and, later on, in Kyriakos Matsis street in Ayios Dhometios (1968–1984). Thanks to the efforts of Bishop Zareh Aznavorian and with financial aid from the Evangelical Church of Westphalia, the new Prelature building was erected in 1983, next to the Virgin Mary church and the Nareg school in Nicosia, by architects Athos Dikaios & Alkis Dikaios; it was officially inaugurated on 4 March 1984, during the pastoral visit of Catholicos Karekin II. By initiative of Archbishop Varoujan Hergelian, in 1998 the basement of the building was renovated and the “Vahram Utidjian” Hall was formed; previously a store room, it became a reality from the proceeds of the auction in 1994 of the art collection that Vahram Utidjian had donated to the Prelature in 1954. It was inaugurated on 3 February 1999 by Catholicos Aram I; numerous charity, communal and cultural events take place there. The Prelature’s consistory houses a collection of ecclesiastical relics, some of which were previously in the old Virgin Mary church or the Magaravank.

The current Charter of the Prelature, first drafted in 1945 and ratified in 1950, consists of 102 articles and, in its present form, applies as of 3 September 2010. The administration is exercised by the Armenian Ethnarchy (Ազգային Իշխանութիւն) through the Diocesan Council [Թեմական Ժողով (Temagan Joghov), consisting of the Prelate, two priests and twelve elected lay persons - 7 for Nicosia, 3 for Larnaca, 1 for Limassol and 1 for Famagusta] and the Administrative Council [Վարչական Ժողով (Varchagan Joghov), presided by the Prelate and consisting of seven lay persons appointed by the Temagan], currently chaired by Sebouh Tavitian (as of 2007) and John Guevherian (as of 2011), respectively. As of 1998, the elected Representative is ex officio a member of the Diocesan Council. There are also the local parish committees (թաղական հոգաբարձութիւններ, one in Nicosia, one in Larnaca and one in Limassol), the committee for Christian instruction (Քրիստոնէական դաստիարակութեան յանձնախումբ) and the Ladies’ committee (Տիկնանց յանձնախումբ). Under the committee for Christian instruction are the Sunday schools (Կիրակնօրեայ վարժարաններ) and the youth committee (երիտասարդական յանձնախումբ).

According to the Decision of the Council of Ministers 66.589/19–12–2007, the Armenian Prelature of Cyprus receives an annual grant of €59,800 by the Republic of Cyprus; the Republic also pays the salaries of the Prelature's clergy and covers their medical and health care (Decision of the Council of Ministers 48.166/22–07–1998). The same arrangements apply for the Maronite Archbishopric of Cyprus and the Latin Vicariate of Cyprus (the latter, however, receives an annual grant of €51,260).

List of Prelates 

Below is the list of Prelates of the Armenian Prelature of Cyprus, according to available information. Unfortunately, there are some gaps:

References

See also
Armenian religion in Cyprus
Armenians in Cyprus
Armenian education in Cyprus

Armenian Apostolic Church in Cyprus
Cyprus
Oriental Orthodox dioceses in Europe